Pocahontas School District is a public school district based in Pocahontas, Arkansas, United States. The Pocahontas School District provides early childhood, elementary and secondary education for more than 2,000 pre-kindergarten through grade 12 students. Pocahontas School District is accredited by the Arkansas Department of Education (ADE) and by AdvancED since 2009.

History 
On July 1, 2010, the Twin Rivers School District was dissolved. A portion of the district was given to the Pocahontas district.

Schools 
 Pocahontas High School—serving approximately 400 students in grades 10 through 12.
 Pocahontas Junior High School—serving more than 400 students in grades 7 through 9.
 M. D. Williams Intermediate School—serving approximately 550 students in grades 3 through 6.
 Alma Spikes Elementary School—serving approximately 450 students in pre-kindergarten through grade 2.

Prior to August 26, 1957, the district sent, via contract, high school-aged African-American children to Booker T. Washington High School in Jonesboro, Arkansas, which was operated by the Jonesboro School District. On that day the Jonesboro district's board of trustees ended the contract.

References

Further reading
Maps of the predecessor districts:
  (Download)

External links 

 
 

School districts in Arkansas
Education in Lawrence County, Arkansas
Education in Randolph County, Arkansas
Education in Pope County, Arkansas
Education in Conway County, Arkansas
School districts established in 1879
1879 establishments in Arkansas